Modupe Ozolua (born on 10th of October 1973, in Benin City, Nigeria) is a Nigerian philanthropist and entrepreneur. She served as the CEO of Body Enhancement Ltd, and is the founding president of Empower 54 Project Initiatives (Empower 54) formerly known as Body Enhancement Annual Reconstructive Surgery (BEARS) Foundation.

Early life and education 
Ozolua is a direct descendant of the Oba (King) Ozolua of the Benin Kingdom, Edo State, Nigeria. Ozolua is the youngest of four siblings born to Prince Julius I. Ozolua, an educationist, and Princess Olua Mary S. Ozolua (née Otaru), a princess and entrepreneur from Ososo, Akoko-Edo LGA, Edo State. Her name "Modupe" means "I give thanks" in Yoruba.

She grew up in the royal house of the Benin Kingdom, where her great grandfather, Oba Ozolua ruled as king.

Ozolua studied business management in California, USA. At Southwestern College, she was inducted into the Alpha Pi Epsilon, chapter of Phi Theta Kappa and recognized as an outstanding student by the Southwestern Dean's Honorary List and the National Dean's List (1994 - 1995).

Personal life 
Ozolua has a son, Prince Oluwaseun Ozolua-Osunbade. She moves between Nigeria and Atlanta.

Career 
Ozolua returned to Nigeria in 2001 and started Body Enhancements Ltd, a cosmetic surgery company. Despite the challenges of having a controversial service in a conservative African country, Body Enhancement Ltd became a pioneer in the beauty and health sectors in Nigeria. Ozolua used the platform that her business provided to educate the public about the safety of plastic surgery, breaking prevalent myths of the time.

In 2003, she founded Empower 54, formerly known as Body Enhancement Foundation, or Body Enhancement Annual Reconstructive Surgery (BEARS), an international humanitarian organization dedicated to providing humanitarian assistance such as medical missions, hunger eradication, education, female empowerment, and refugee programs to underprivileged Africans. Archbishop Desmond Tutu was a patron of Empower 54.

All humanitarian aid rendered through Empower 54 is free to the beneficiaries. Under Ozolua's leadership, Empower 54's "Rise Above Terror" initiative has been active in rehabilitating women and children survivors of the Boko Haram terrorist group in Nigeria, through self-employment and education for the children at the IDP camps. Ozolua personally leads the Empower 54 team into communities attacked by Boko Haram in remote parts of North-East Nigeria to help survivors of terrorist attacks.

During one of the foundation's missions, she discovered the extremely malnourished children rescued from Boko Haram's captivity and facilitated the collaboration between Empower 54 and the Borno State Government in evacuating them to Maiduguri for urgent CMAM treatment. 1,500 children were evacuated from Bama, along with their families.

Projects 
 Niger Delta and Kano State: Bringing Hope to Nigerian Children Suffering From Birth Defects (2003)
 Edo State, Nigeria:  Reconstructive surgery of victims of contaminated kerosene explosions (2004)
 Niger Delta, Nigeria: Reconstructive Surgery for underprivileged children (2004)
 Niger Delta, Nigeria: Reconstructive surgery for underprivileged children (2005) 
 Kwara State, Nigeria: Free National Medical Mission (2006)
 Tabora, Tanzania: Medical Mission (2007) 
 Free medical missions in Ethiopia, Mali, Niger Republic and Zambia (2010 to present)
 Adamawa State: Establishment of school at IDP camp (February 2015) 
 Gombe State: Rehabilitation of Internally Displaced Persons (IDPs) in Gombe State, North East Nigeria ( February 2015)
 Adamawa and Borno States: E54's RISE caps pilot scheme (April 2015)
 Adamawa, Gombe and Borno States: Inspection of communities destroyed by Boko Haram (May/June 2015)
 Government Junior Secondary School (GJSS) renovation of schools destroyed by Boko Haram in Uba, Adamawa State (July 2015) 
 Malkoi Camp & NYSC Camp, Adamawa State, Nigeria (September 2015) 
 Rise Above Terror..What Happens Next? Abuja, Nigeria (9 October 2015)
 Empower 54 Annual African Art Gala, Atlanta, Georgia (30 April 2016) 
 Evacuation of extremely malnourished children from Bama, Borno State, Nigeria. (June 2016)
 Building of two classrooms for IDP children, Bakasi IDP camp, Maiduguri (June 2016) 
 Donation of 40 foot container of medication and nutritional meals to IDPs, Borno State, Nigeria (January 2017)
 Establishment of small-scale Ready-To-Use-Therapeutic-Food (RUTF) production facility in Abuja, Nigeria (March 2017)
 Donation of paint and computers to schools in Mai-Ndombe Province, Democratic Republic of the Congo (May 2017)
 Provision of Vitamin A and Albendazol medication for 620,000 children in Mai-Ndombe Province (September 2017) 
 Provision of Vitamin A and Albendazol medication for 5 million children in the oil producing states of the Niger Delta, Nigeria (February 2018)

Awards 
 Award of Excellence  Obafemi Awolowo University, Moremi Hall Executive Council, Ile-ife
 Beautician of the Year  5th City People Award for Excellence
 Excellence in Enterprise Award  Dr Kwame Nkrumah International Award, Ghana
 Female Achiever of the Year, (2001)  City People Award, Nigeria
 Humanitarian Service Award  Rotaract Club of Nigeria (Rotary International)
  Merit Award  Lagos State Aids Control Agency Governor's Office (LSACA), Outstanding Nigerian Woman, Nigerian Women's Award, 5th Annual Ceremony
 Young Manager of the Year (2005), Nomination  This Day newspaper, Nigeria
 SheRose Awards (2018)  SheRose, Ireland

References

External links

1973 births
Living people
People from Benin City
Nigerian philanthropists
Cosmetic surgery
20th-century Nigerian businesswomen
20th-century Nigerian businesspeople
21st-century Nigerian businesswomen
21st-century Nigerian businesspeople
Nigerian Christians
DeVry University alumni
Social entrepreneurs
Nigerian nonprofit businesspeople
Founders of charities